The Honda Project 2&4 is an open-wheel concept car that was initially unveiled at International Motor Show Germany in 2015. Its design is largely inspired by the Honda RA272 Formula One race car, and the car itself is powered by the V4 engine derived from the Honda RC213V MotoGP motorcycle.

References

Project 2and4
Cars introduced in 2015